Rudolf Havelka (1927–2007) was an international speedway rider from Czechoslovakia.

Speedway career 
Havelka was champion of Czechoslovakia on two occasions after winning the Czechoslovakian Championship in 1950 and 1957.

References 

1927 births
2007 deaths
Czech speedway riders
People from Pardubice District
Sportspeople from the Pardubice Region